Football broadcast in India is dominated by branded sports networks Star Sports, Sony Sports and Sports18 on television and OTT platforms.

Indian competitions 
List of current broadcasters:

International club football competitions 
List of current broadcasters:

International football competitions 
List of current broadcasters:

See also 
Sports broadcasting contracts in India
Sports broadcasters in India

References 

Football in India
Sports television in India
Lists of association football broadcasters